Davlat Khudonazarov (Russian and) (1944-, in Khorugh, Gorno-Badakhshan Autonomous Region, Tajik SSR) is a Tajik filmmaker, politician and human rights activist.

Political career 
Khudanazarov was a prominent filmmaker when he was elected People's Deputy from Tajikistan to the Supreme Soviet of the USSR in 1988. He was elected as chairman of the Soviet Union of Cinematographers in 1989. He was the chief peace-negotiator between the army and the demonstrators in the February 1990 Dushanbe riots. In contrast to Kakhar Makhamov, the then president of Tajikistan who supported the August 1991 Coup in Moscow, Khudonazarov was one of the organizers of the counter-coup resistance. He ran against Rahmon Nabiev in the presidential elections in November 1991 as the candidate of the opposition coalition. In the election Khudonazarov was supported by Pamiris, Gharmis and urban elites. He received 35% of the popular vote. Khudonazarov worked as a peacemaker during the Tajik Civil War (1992–1996). In 1994–95 he was Peace Fellow at the United States Institute of Peace, and Galina Starovoitova Fellow in Human Rights and Conflict Resolution at Kennan Institute of the Woodrow Wilson Center in 2005.

Filmography 
He has filmed many movies and documentaries as a director and cinematographer:

 V talom snege zvon ruchya (1982)
 Yunosti pervoe utro (1979)
 The Song of the Little Road (2003)

See also
Politics of Tajikistan
CNN Interview with Davlat Khudonazarov

Living people
1944 births
Pamiri people
Tajikistani documentary filmmakers
Soviet film directors
Tajikistani film directors
Tajikistani activists
Democratic Party (Tajikistan) politicians
Gerasimov Institute of Cinematography alumni
People from Gorno-Badakhshan Autonomous Region